Peter or Pete Strange may refer to:

Real People
Pete Strange (1938-2004), musician
Peter Strange (pornographic actor), real name Jake Steed
Peter S. Strange, chairman of the Federal Reserve Bank of Cleveland Cincinnati Branch

Fictional characters
Peter Strange, the central character in 1968 film The Strange Affair
Peter Strange, in After the Ball (1932 film)